The 1946 Titleholders Championship was contested from April 9–12 at Augusta Country Club. It was the 7th edition of the Titleholders Championship.

This event was won by Louise Suggs.

Round summaries

First round

Second round

Third round

Final round

External links
St. Petersburg Times first round source
St. Petersburg Times second round source
Youngstown Vindicator third round source
St. Petersburg Times fourth round source
The Palm Beach Post fourth round source

Titleholders Championship
Golf in Georgia (U.S. state)
Titleholders Championship
Titleholders Championship
Titleholders Championship
Titleholders Championship
Women's sports in Georgia (U.S. state)